Jazan or Jizan may refer to:

Iran - Jazan 
 Jazan, Alborz
 Jazan, Isfahan
 Jazan, Markazi
 Jazan, Semnan

Saudi Arabia - Jazan or Jizan
 Jizan, a city
 Jizan Region
 Jazan University